Health Promotion International is a quarterly peer-reviewed public health journal covering health promotion. It was established in 1986 at the John Snow Pub on Broadwick Street in London, England. The journal's founder was Ilona Kickbusch, who is now the chair emerita of its editorial board. Originally named Health Promotion, the journal obtained its current name in 1990. It is published by Oxford University Press and the editor-in-chief is Evelyne de Leeuw (University of New South Wales). According to the Journal Citation Reports, the journal has a 2019 impact factor of 1.980, ranking it 40th out of 87 journals in the category "Health Policy & Services" and 65th out of 170 in the category "Public, Environmental & Occupational Health".

References

External links
 

Health policy journals
Public health journals
Health promotion
Publications established in 1986
Oxford University Press academic journals
Bimonthly journals
English-language journals